Mexico–Zimbabwe relations are the diplomatic relations between the United Mexican States and the Republic of Zimbabwe. Both nations are members of the Group of 15 and the United Nations.

History
In 1965, Rhodesia (present day Zimbabwe) obtained its independence from the United Kingdom. Mexico refused to recognize or establish diplomatic relations with the nation due to its apartheid like system. At the end of the Rhodesian Bush War in December 1979, Rhodesia changed its name to Zimbabwe in 1980. Mexico and Zimbabwe established diplomatic relations in March 1985. In 1990, Mexico opened a resident embassy in Harare, however, the embassy was closed in 1994 and Mexico accredited its embassy in Pretoria, South Africa to Zimbabwe.

In September 1986, Mexican Foreign Minister Bernardo Sepúlveda Amor attended the Non-Aligned Movement conference celebrated in Harare. In November 1991, Mexican President Carlos Salinas de Gortari and Zimbabwean Prime Minister Robert Mugabe met in Caracas, Venezuela during the Group of 15 summit. In 1998, during the inauguration of South African President Thabo Mbeki, Mexican Foreign Minister Rosario Green met with President Robert Mugabe. In May 2017, President Mugabe paid a visit to Cancun, Mexico to attend the United Nations Cancun Conference on Disaster Risk Reduction, along with Foreign Minister Simbarashe Mumbengegwi and Minister of Environment Oppah Muchinguri.

In May 2013, Mexican Economy Undersecretary Francisco de Rosenzweig paid a visit to Zimbabwe, along with the Mexican Ambassador to Ethiopia, Juan Alfredo Miranda Ortiz, to promote the candidacy of Dr. Herminio Blanco Mendoza as Director-General of the World Trade Organization. Since 2008, the Mexican government offers each year scholarships for nationals of Zimbabwe to study postgraduate studies at Mexican higher education institutions.

High-level visits
High-level visits from Mexico to Zimbabwe
 Foreign Minister Bernardo Sepúlveda Amor (1986)
 Undersecretary of the Economy Francisco de Rosenzweig (2013)

High-level visits from Zimbabwe to Mexico
 Minister of Environment Francis Nhema (2010)
 President Robert Mugabe (2017)
 Foreign Minister Simbarashe Mumbengegwi (2017)
 Minister of Environment Oppah Muchinguri (2017)

Trade
In 2018, trade between Mexico and Zimbabwe totaled US$1.4 million. Mexico's main exports to Zimbabwe include: wheeled tractors; cards equipped with an electronic integrated chips; control units and adapters; white corn; and zinc minerals. Zimbabwe's main exports to Mexico include: vermiculite; perlite and chlorites; undilated strips and films; thermoplastic materials for welding; and statuary and sculpture materials.

Diplomatic missions
 Mexico is accredited to Zimbabwe from its embassy in Pretoria, South Africa.
 Zimbabwe is accredited to Mexico from its embassy in Washington, D.C., United States.

See also
 List of ambassadors of Mexico to Zimbabwe

References 

 
Zimbabwe
Mexico